Edward Alexander Wadsworth  (29 October 1889 – 21 June 1949) was an English artist, closely associated with modernist Vorticism movement. He painted coastal views, abstracts, portraits and still-life in tempera medium and works printed using wood engraving and copper. In the First World War he designed dazzle camouflage for the Royal Navy, and continued to paint nautical themes after the war.

Early life and study
Wadsworth was born on 29 October 1889 in Cleckheaton, West Yorkshire, and educated at Fettes College in Edinburgh. He studied engineering in Munich between 1906 and 1907, where he studied art in his spare time at the Knirr School. This provoked a change of course, as he attended Bradford School of Art before earning a scholarship to the Slade School of Art, London. His contemporaries at the school included Stanley Spencer, CRW Nevinson, Mark Gertler, Dora Carrington and David Bomberg.

Career
Wadsworth's work was included in Roger Fry's second Post-Impressionism Exhibition at the Grafton Galleries, 1912, in London, but he changed allegiance shortly after through friendship with Wyndham Lewis, and exhibited some futurist-derived paintings at the Futurist Exhibitions at the Doré Gallery. Although a member of the committee that organised a dinner in honour of Filippo Tommaso Marinetti in 1913, he was one of a number of British painters in the nascent avant-garde that became increasingly disenchanted with the Italian's arrogance. By June of the following year, he was in a group of artists, including Lewis, who jeered Marinetti's public performance of The Battle Of Adrianople. He was a signatory of the Vorticist Manifesto published in BLAST the next month, and also supplied a review of Kandinsky's Concerning The Spiritual In Art and images to be reproduced in the magazine.

First World War

Thirty three days after the Vorticist Manifesto was published, war was declared on Germany. Vorticism managed to continue into 1915, with a Vorticist Exhibition, June 1915 at the Doré Gallery and a second edition of BLAST published to coincide with the show. Wadsworth contributed to both, but signed up for the navy shortly after. His fellow vorticist Henri Gaudier-Brzeska was killed at the front and Bomberg and Lewis found that their belief in the purity of the machine age was seriously challenged by the realities of the trenches. Wadsworth spent the war in the Royal Naval Volunteer Reserve on the island of Mudros until invalided out in 1917, transferring dazzle camouflage designs onto allied ships. Known as Dazzle ships, these vessels were not camouflaged to become invisible, but instead used ideas derived from Vorticism and Cubism to confuse enemy U-boats trying to pinpoint the direction and speed of travel. Dazzle camouflage was invented and designed by Norman Wilkinson. Always a fan of modern ships, Wadsworth was to use nautical themes in his art for the rest of his career.

The return to order
Heralded by the major painting Dazzle-ships in Drydock at Liverpool, 1919, Wadsworth moved away from the avant-garde in the 1920s, and adopted a more realistic style. Wadsworth was a member of Unit One. Towards the end of his life his work became increasingly strange and surreal, although Wadsworth never had any formal links with the official Surrealist movement.

Later life
Wadsworth died in 1949, and is buried in Brompton Cemetery.

Influences
The graphic designer Peter Saville had seen Wadsworth's painting Dazzle-ships in Drydock at Liverpool and was struck by the image. After suggesting the idea and title to Andy McCluskey of Orchestral Manoeuvres in the Dark, Saville carried the theme over to the sleeve design of their album Dazzle Ships (1983).

References

Further reading
 Black, Jonathan. (2006) Edward Wadsworth. I.B. Tauris.
 Greenwood, Jeremy. (2002) The Graphic Work of Edward Wadsworth. Wood Lea Press.
 Edward Wadsworth, in Behrens, Roy R., (2009) Camoupedia: A Compendium of Research on Art, Architecture and Camouflage. Bobolink Books.
 LIT: Exhibition catalogue (1990) Camden Arts Centre.
 Memorial Exhibition Catalogue, (1951) Tate Gallery.
 Lewison, Jeremy (editor). (1990) A Genius of Industrial England; Edward Wadsworth 1889–1949. The Arkwright Arts Trust.
 Wadsworth, Barbara. (1989) Edward Wadsworth. A Painter's Life. Michael Russell Publishing.

External links
 
Works by Wadsworth at the Tate Gallery
 

 Profile on Royal Academy of Arts Collections

Vorticists
20th-century English painters
English male painters
1889 births
1949 deaths
People educated at Fettes College
Technical University of Munich alumni
Burials at Brompton Cemetery
Alumni of the Slade School of Fine Art
People from Cleckheaton
Camoufleurs
Associates of the Royal Academy
Group X
20th-century English male artists